Phyllopentas ledermannii is a species of plant in the family Rubiaceae. It is found in Cameroon and Nigeria. Its natural habitats are subtropical or tropical moist lowland forests, subtropical or tropical moist montane forests, and subtropical or tropical high-altitude grassland. It is threatened by habitat loss.

References

Knoxieae
Vulnerable plants
Taxonomy articles created by Polbot
Taxa named by Birgitta Bremer